Evan Mehdi Fournier (born 29 October 1992) is a French professional basketball player for the New York Knicks of the National Basketball Association (NBA). He played junior basketball at the French INSEP academy from 2007 to 2009.

Early life
Fournier was born on 29 October 1992 in Saint-Maurice, a small suburb outside of Paris. He is of Algerian descent by his mother while his father is French. He became interested in basketball in 2002, thanks to the 2001–02 Sacramento Kings team. Fournier wore the number 10 on his jersey in honor of then-Sacramento King, Mike Bibby.

Professional career

JSF Nanterre (2009–2010)
In September 2009, Fournier signed a one-year deal with JSF Nanterre of the LNB Pro B.

Poitiers Basket 86 (2010–2012) 
In June 2010, Fournier signed a two-year deal Poitiers Basket 86 of the LNB Pro A.

Denver Nuggets (2012–2014)
On 28 June 2012, Fournier was selected with the 20th overall pick by the Denver Nuggets in the 2012 NBA draft. On 11 July 2012, he signed his rookie scale contract with the Nuggets. He then joined the Nuggets for the 2012 NBA Summer League. Over the Nuggets' first 73 games of the 2012–13 season, Fournier had appeared in just 29 of them and while registering 10 points or more just once. He appeared in nine straight games to finish the regular season, including starting the final three. During this late-season stretch, he averaged 12.3 points and scored 17 points or more four games, including a season-best 24 points on 14 April 2013.

In July 2013, Fournier re-joined the Nuggets for the 2013 NBA Summer League. On 30 October 2013, the Nuggets exercised their third-year team option on Fournier's rookie scale contract, extending the contract through the 2014–15 season. On 23 February 2014, Fournier scored a then career-high 27 points against the Sacramento Kings.

Orlando Magic (2014–2021)
 
On 26 June 2014, Fournier was traded, along with the draft rights to Devyn Marble, to the Orlando Magic in exchange for Arron Afflalo. On 26 October 2013, the Magic exercised their fourth-year team option on Fournier's rookie scale contract, extending the contract through the 2015–16 season. On 12 November 2014, Fournier scored a then career-high 28 points on 8-of-14 shooting in a 97–95 win over the New York Knicks.

On 3 November 2015, Fournier set a new career high with 30 points in a 103–94 win over the New Orleans Pelicans. On 15 March 2016, Fournier matched his career high with a 30-point effort against the Denver Nuggets. In 2015–16, Fournier had a career year in which he averaged personal highs in scoring (15.4 ppg), rebounding (2.8 rpg), assists (2.7 apg), steals (1.2 spg) and minutes (32.5 mpg). He led the team in scoring 19 times, had 24 20-point games and two 30-point games.

On 7 July 2016, Fournier re-signed with the Magic on a five-year, $85 million contract. On 3 November 2016, he scored a season-high 29 points against the Sacramento Kings.

On 16 January 2018, Fournier scored a career-high 28 points plus 4 in a 108–102 win over the Minnesota Timberwolves. On 7 March 2018, against the Los Angeles Lakers, Fournier sprained his left medial collateral ligament. He was subsequently ruled out for "a significant stretch of time".

On 1 December 2019, Fournier tied his career-high of 32 points in a game in a 100-96 win over Golden State.

Boston Celtics (2021)
 
On 25 March 2021, Fournier was traded to the Boston Celtics in exchange for Jeff Teague and two future second round draft picks. Fournier had played and started in 26 games and was averaging 19.7 points, 2.9 rebounds, 3.7 assists and 1.0 steals, while shooting 38.8 percent from three-point range with the Magic for the season. On 29 March, Fournier debuted for the Celtics against the New Orleans Pelicans but went scoreless in 33 minutes of action. On 2 April, Fournier scored 23 points and logged a career-high seven 3-pointers in a 118–102 win over the Houston Rockets. Fournier put up 20 points of his 23 point-performance in the fourth quarter, becoming the second Celtics player to score 20 points on 100 percent shooting in a quarter since Paul Pierce. He missed several games due to the NBA's COVID-19 health and safety protocols.

New York Knicks (2021–present)
On 17 August 2021, the New York Knicks acquired Fournier in a sign-and-trade deal with the Celtics. On October 20, Fournier made his Knicks debut, tying a career-high 32 points in a 138–134 double overtime win over his former team, the Boston Celtics. On 6 January 2022, Fournier surpassed that career-high, scoring 41 points behind ten three-pointers, along with eight rebounds, in a 108–105 victory over the Celtics. On 23 March, in a 121–106 win over the Charlotte Hornets, he broke the Knicks' record of most 3-pointers made in a season, surpassing John Starks' record set in 1995 (217).

NBA career statistics

Regular season

|-
| style="text-align:left;"|
| style="text-align:left;"|Denver
| 38 || 4 || 11.3 || .493 || .407 || .769 || .9 || 1.2 || .5 || .0 || 5.3
|-
| style="text-align:left;"|
| style="text-align:left;"|Denver
| 76 || 4 || 19.8 || .419 || .376 || .756 || 2.7 || 1.5 || .4 || .1 || 8.4
|-
| style="text-align:left;"|
| style="text-align:left;"|Orlando
| 58 || 32 || 28.6 || .440 || .378 || .728 || 2.6 || 2.1 || .7 || .0 || 12.0
|-
| style="text-align:left;"|
| style="text-align:left;"|Orlando
| 79 || 71 || 32.5 || .462 || .400 || .836 || 2.8 || 2.7 || 1.2 || .0 || 15.4
|-
| style="text-align:left;"|
| style="text-align:left;"|Orlando
| 68 || 66 || 32.9 || .439 || .356 || .805 || 3.1 || 3.0 || 1.0 || .1 || 17.2
|-
| style="text-align:left;"|
| style="text-align:left;"|Orlando
| 57 || 57 || 32.2 || .459 || .379 || .867 || 3.2 || 2.9 || .8 || .3 || 17.8
|-
| style="text-align:left;"|
| style="text-align:left;"|Orlando
| 81 || 81 || 31.5 || .438 || .340 || .806 || 3.2 || 3.6 || .9 || .1 || 15.1
|-
| style="text-align:left;"|
| style="text-align:left;"|Orlando
| 66 || 66 || 31.5 || .467 || .399 || .818 || 2.6 || 3.2 || 1.1 || .2 || 18.5
|-
| style="text-align:left;"|
| style="text-align:left;"|Orlando
| 26 || 26 || 30.3 || .461 || .388 || .797 || 2.9 || 3.7 || 1.0 || .3 || 19.7
|-
| style="text-align:left;"|
| style="text-align:left;"|Boston
| 16 || 10 || 29.5 || .448 || .463 || .714 || 3.3 || 3.1 || 1.3 || .6 || 13.0
|-
| style="text-align:left;"|
| style="text-align:left;"|New York
| 80 || 80 || 29.5 || .417 || .389 || .708 || 2.6 || 2.1 || 1.0 || .3 || 14.1
|- class="sortbottom"
| style="text-align:center;" colspan="2"|Career
| 645 || 497 || 28.6 || .445 || .381 || .798 || 2.7 || 2.6 || .9 || .2 || 14.3

Playoffs

|-
| style="text-align:left;"|2013
| style="text-align:left;"|Denver
| 4 || 4 || 13.3 || .353 || .000 || .875 || .0 || 1.0 || .5 || .0 || 4.8
|-
| style="text-align:left;"|2019
| style="text-align:left;"|Orlando
| 5 || 5 || 35.0 || .348 || .235 || .750 || 3.2 || 2.0 || 1.4 || .0 || 12.4
|-
| style="text-align:left;"|2020
| style="text-align:left;"|Orlando
| 5 || 5 || 34.2 || .351 || .343 || .706 || 4.0 || 2.6 || 1.2 || .6 || 12.8
|-
| style="text-align:left;"|2021
| style="text-align:left;"|Boston
| 5 || 5 || 33.4 || .429 || .433 || .833 || 3.6 || 1.4 || 1.2 || .0 || 15.4
|- class="sortbottom"
| style="text-align:center;" colspan="2"|Career
| 19 || 19 || 29.8 || .374 || .308 || .778 || 2.8 || 1.8 || 1.1 || .2 || 11.7

Awards and honors
 medal at the 2022 FIBA EuroBasket 
 medal at the 2020 Summer Olympics
 medal at the 2019 FIBA Basketball World Cup
 medal at the 2014 FIBA Basketball World Cup
 medal at the 2011 FIBA Europe Under-20 Championship
 medal at the 2009 FIBA Europe Under-18 Championship
Participated in the 2011 Nike Hoop Summit
LNB Pro A Best Young Player in 2010–11 and 2011–12
LNB Pro A Most Improved Player in 2010–11 and 2011–12
Selected in the All-Tournament team at the 2019 FIBA Basketball World Cup
Selected in the All-Tournament team at the 2011 FIBA Europe Under-20 Championship
Selected in the All-Tournament team at the 2009 FIBA Europe Under-18 Championship

Personal life
Fournier and wife Laura have a son. In 2020, the couple bought a $2.9 million estate in Winter Park, Florida.

References

External links

 Evan Fournier at lnb.fr

1992 births
Living people
People from Saint-Maurice, Val-de-Marne
Sportspeople from Val-de-Marne
French sportspeople of Algerian descent
2014 FIBA Basketball World Cup players
2019 FIBA Basketball World Cup players
Basketball players at the 2020 Summer Olympics
Boston Celtics players
Denver Nuggets draft picks
Denver Nuggets players
French expatriate basketball people in the United States
French men's basketball players
Medalists at the 2020 Summer Olympics
Nanterre 92 players
National Basketball Association players from France
New York Knicks players
Olympic basketball players of France
Olympic medalists in basketball
Olympic silver medalists for France
Orlando Magic players
Poitiers Basket 86 players
Shooting guards
Small forwards